Roxbury High School is a four-year comprehensive public high school in the Succasunna section of Roxbury in Morris County, New Jersey, United States, serving students in ninth grade through twelfth grades, operating as the lone secondary school of the Roxbury School District, which serves more than 3,500 students.

The school serves students from Roxbury, as well as from Mount Arlington, who attend as part of a sending/receiving relationship with the Mount Arlington School District.

As of the 2021–22 school year, the school had an enrollment of 1,195 students and 121.9 classroom teachers (on an FTE basis), for a student–teacher ratio of 9.8:1. There were 115 students (9.6% of enrollment) eligible for free lunch and 44 (3.7% of students) eligible for reduced-cost lunch.

History
The high school was established in 1903, operating on the top floor of a two-story building that served grades 1-12. The current Roxbury High School facility was completed in 1961.

Choice school
Eisenhower Middle School and Roxbury High School are choice schools for the Fine and Performing Arts. Students are eligible to apply for an array of programs including three levels of symphonic band, four levels of choir, multiple levels of dance, an accomplished strings program, and electives such as music theory and Broadway musical theatre. In addition, there are nine select group choirs, a variety of wind ensembles, and two marching bands that allow students to pursue interests beyond the school day in the co-curricular domain. There is an annual fall drama and a spring musical that brings together the talent of the performing arts in a show that rivals a professional presentation. An extensive visual art program is offered, with a four-year college prep track including AP Art Studio, and numerous electives that include four levels of ceramics, three of photography, graphic design and yearbook production. Co-curricular opportunities are also available in the visual arts. Students are eligible to participate if they're in grades 7-12, with a maximum of 6 seats available for new students. Students are selected through an application process with the implementation of a waitlist and a lottery if more than six requests are received.

Awards, recognition and rankings
The school was the 74th-ranked public high school in New Jersey out of 411 schools statewide according to Niche.com's annual rankings in 2019.  Their site explains, “Niche ranks nearly 100,000 schools and districts based on statistics and millions of opinions from students and parents.”

In the past, Roxbury was ranked by NJ Monthly Magazine with the following:

2016: 52nd out of 337 schools

2014: 102nd out of 339 schools

2012: 63rd out of 328 schools

2010: 115th out of 322 schools

2008: 98th out of 316 schools

Future Ready
In 2017, Roxbury High School and Eisenhower Middle School earned Bronze Certification through the Future Ready Schools - New Jersey. This inaugural program recognizes and supports schools who are deepening student learning and developing a culture of digital innovation to use technology, digital content, and media to better prepare students for the future.  This program is in partnership with the New Jersey Department of Education, New Jersey School Boards Association and New Jersey Institute of Technology.

Sustainable Jersey for Schools
In 2018, Roxbury School District earned Bronze level Certification through Sustainable Jersey for Schools. Sustainable Jersey for Schools provides grants, resources, and trainings for schools and districts to “take steps to create a brighter future, one school at a time”.  The mission is to support and reward schools who take steps to become more sustainable. “Bronze certification means a school has made a commitment to sustainability and succeeded in implementing significant first steps, while silver certification means a school has made significant progress in a number of categories toward sustainability and is a statewide and national leader”.

Campus
In 2003, a referendum was passed to add a music suite and an athletic training area/weight room to the original facility, which was completed in 2006. The school shares Bryant Drive with nearby Eisenhower Middle School. Behind the school are athletic fields, including a turf field in 2010 and a resurfaced track in 2012. A wooded area was also used for an extensive "Project Adventure" program (which included various types of climbing and trust-building activities for freshmen), but that was destroyed during Hurricane Sandy in 2012. It has been rebuilt in 2015 on the side of the building near the two softball fields and remains an integral part of the Physical Education curriculum. In addition to the turf field, the school has one soccer field, two softball fields, a baseball field, three outdoor volleyball courts, a utility field (used for lacrosse, field hockey, and soccer), and three practice fields.

Energy
The school only has windows on the front of the building, which faces northwest. This was done in order to save on energy costs, as the school was built during the prelude to the 1973 energy crisis.  In 2017–2018, Roxbury completed the state sponsored Energy Audit program through the Board of Public Utilities (BPU). This has led to the Energy Savings Initiative Program, which has allowed Roxbury to upgrade its primary systems (including the replacement of all light fixtures, now LEDs) through a fully funded grant. In addition, Roxbury has been replacing the HVAC units, re-doing the roof, and has installed a new boiler between 2012 and 2018 in an effort to be more energy efficient.  The district is also looking into the installation of photovoltaic solar panels on the roof of the high school.

Gardens
Under the guidance of Meg Fagan, Robin Dunn, the Environmental Club, and Geophysical Science students, a walkthrough garden was established in memory of Mrs. Jane Hopper, who died in 2008.  This flower garden features a couple benches, a trellis archway, many species of flowers, and a pond.  This garden has given the front of the school a major uplift with its gorgeous array of plants.  In addition, two hydroponic tower gardens were installed in the cafeteria, as part of a grant received.  These gardens will be maintained and utilized by students in the culinary classes, Extended School Year (ESY), and many of the students in the Special Education program.  Flower bed gardens have also been created in the back of the school by former student Matt Cordileone, who built them during his Senior Option.  These gardens are designed to be wheelchair accessible so students who are differently abled may tend to them.

Murals
The school has commissioned two significant murals to be completed at the high school.  In the Spring of 2008, a mural was completed outside in the front the building as part of Rachel's Challenge, a movement to prevent school bullying through a chain reaction of kindness.

The second was constructed in October 2017 in the main lobby as part of an artROX workshop to take art outside the classroom and bring together three others schools - Wallkill Valley Regional High School, High Point Regional High School, and Paramus High School.  The workshop featured three artists - Ian Ferguson, Lala Abaddon, and Sarah Potter. The mural ties together the things that make Roxbury and Roxbury High School unique, including the Black River winding through Roxbury, featuring Horseshoe Lake, athletic equipment for Roxbury sports, and iconic locations in town such as the abandoned factory.

In addition, a number of other murals decorate the walls, and most of the interior doors feature works from past and present students.  The art department works each year to add new pieces to the building.

Security
In 2017, the district brought on former Roxbury Chief of Police, James Simonetti, to serve as the Director of Security to improve safety procedures. This included the addition of man-traps, upgraded security cameras, revisiting policies and procedures, as well as improving the vetting of visitors.  As a result, Roxbury was ranked as the 17th safest school in New Jersey (of 237 districts) and 120th out of 10,576 Nationally in 2018.

Administration
The school's principal is Dominick Miller. His core administrative team includes two assistant principals, a Director of Guidance, and an Athletic Director.

Curriculum
The school follows the New Jersey state curriculum. In order to graduate, the school requires students to take 140 credits across four years with a minimum of seven subjects (35 credits) each year, but are encouraged to take eight subjects (40 credits).

Required courses 
Course requirements are:

 4 years of English [20 credits]
 1 year of World History [5 credits]
 2 years of United States History [10 credits]
 3 years of Mathematics (must include Algebra II) [15 credits]
 3 years of Science (must include Biology) [15 - 18 credits]
 1 year of a World Language [5 credits]
 1 year of a Practical Art (includes keyboarding, woodworking, and cooking classes) [5 credits]
 1 year of a Visual/Performing Art (includes art-related subjects (i.e. ceramics), band, orchestra, choir, and dance) [5 credits]
 4 years of Physical Education/Health/Driver Theory [20 credits]
 0.5 years Financial Literacy [2.5 credits]

Roxbury High School operates on a block schedule, with classes meeting on alternating A and B days. This change was implemented in the 2012–2013 school year from a 9 period day.  Students have 10 75-minute blocks scheduled across the 2 days, with each day providing students with back-to-back periods of lunch and VIP (Variable Instructional Period) at 35 minutes each (plus 5 minutes passing).  These VIP's serves as an opportunity for students to seek instructional assistance or work on homework in a more formal setting.  Eligible seniors (those who maintain a 75% or higher in each of their classes) may scan out and leave campus during this 75-minute interval, as part of the Senior Open Lunch program.  Other courses will make use of this VIP period, such as Honors and AP Science courses, which will pair a 75-minute class with a VIP to provide additional time for labs.  In addition, freshmen are scheduled to have a full-year Freshman Seminar during one of the VIP slots.  This class is designed to help students transition into the high school, develop stronger relationships with their peers, gain a faculty mentor in a non-academic setting, and engage in curriculum that improves their character and academics.

Physical education
In addition to four years of physical education and health courses, Roxbury implemented a “wellness” elective and a “high performance” elective in the 2012–13 school year for students in grades 10–12.  2015-2016 saw the addition of exercise psychology and exercise physiology as PE electives.  At the same time, a fitness room was constructed, and a dance studio was converted into a wellness room for use with the expanded elective offerings and our athletes.  After superstorm Sandy, a high elements ropes course was rebuilt after the first one was destroyed.

Additional opportunities to earn credits
 Independent Study Program (available to grades 9-11)
 Senior Option Program (available to grade 12)
 College Option Program (available to grades 9-12)

The Independent Study Program and the Senior Option Program allows students to craft a unique curriculum tailored to their interests.  The College Option Program allows students in all grades to pursue coursework through online programs or local college/universities.  These programs allow students to engage in curriculum that Roxbury does not currently offer.  Fields include internships in exploring education (as a teaching assistant), community service, engineering, music, the arts, etc.  Students must submit a proposal for approval and once approved, must document their experiences and make presentations during midterms and finals to share their progress.

Share Time Career and Technical Programs
Roxbury High Students have the opportunity to attend Morris County School of Technology and receive career and technical training during their junior and/or senior years.  Students will take academic courses in Roxbury and then engage in programs designed to prepare them for trade-related employment.

Courses include:
 Auto Body/Collision Repair
 Automotive Service Technology
 Carpentry
 Computer Aided Design & Drafting
 Cosmetology
 Electrical Trades
 Engineering Design and Advanced Manufacturing
 Fundamentals of Buildings and Grounds
 Fundamentals of Food Services
 Fundamentals of Retail & Supermarket Careers
 Machine and Welding Technology
 Plumbing & Pipe Fitting

Athletic Training & Physical Therapy
For the 2018–2019 school year, Roxbury implemented an academy called Athletic Training & Physical Therapy that is available to students in grades 9-12.  This program begins with a course that provides a general overview of the allied health professions of athletic training and physical therapy. The course includes information about the history of athletic training and physical therapy, the scopes of practice for each profession (injury prevention, treatment, rehabilitation, emergency injury management and administrative functions). This course is intended to provide the student with an understanding of the various disciplines, roles and opportunities of the members of the sports medicine team. The course will also provide the students with an understanding of the concepts of health care administration (organizational and administrative considerations and legal and ethical responsibilities). The basics of training and conditioning, environmental concerns, general fitness, nutrition, emergency care, athletics and special populations.  The intention is for this program to grow and for out of district students to attend RHS for this program, which will be partnered with Morris County Vocational School District.

Special education
Roxbury High School offers the following programs as part of Special Services:

Services provided
 Special Education Program
In-Class Resource (ICR)
Out of Class Resource (OCR)
 Language and Learning Disabilities (LLD/Self-Contained)
Speech & Hearing Service
Provides speech and language specialists and a Teacher of the Hearing Impaired for students in need
 Occupational and Physical Therapy
 Sage In-District Counseling
Sage Counseling services are available to general education and special education students who are experiencing emotional difficulties that impact their ability to be successful in school

Behavioral disabilities

DELTA (ED & BD)

Delta is a program for students with behavioral as well as social-emotional difficulties. The program consists of a small structured classroom supported by one main classroom teacher, paraprofessional support, and a counselor. A classroom-wide behavior management system working towards both weekly and monthly goals is utilized. Students may take various electives within the program, or occasionally engage in general education classes outside of the Delta program.

OPUS (ED)

The OPUS program is designed for students with social, emotional, and/or behavioral difficulties that interfere with a positive, successful school experience. The program offers specialized interventions for (1) School avoidance/refusal; (2) Anxiety, depression, or related social-emotional difficulties; and (3) Difficulty with peer relations, socialization, self-esteem. The program offers a wide range of supports and services and includes a strong community component designed to foster a sense of belonging and mutual support among students.  Staff includes special education teachers, social worker, school psychologist, and paraprofessionals.

English as a Second Language (ESL)

Intermediate and Advanced ESL

This program helps non-native English speakers transition into the school and strengthen their communication and cultural skills. Students progress from Intermediate to Advanced ESL as they improve their skills and gain a stronger understanding of the English language.

Learning/language Disabilities (mild to moderate)

STEP transition program and STEP 2

The STEP program provides real-world learning opportunities for students to develop skills relevant for post-high school life. This includes helping with services in the building (making copies, mail/package delivery, bulletin boards, etc.) as well as working jobs outside of the school. STEP 2 will provide a more extensive program for students 18–21 years old.

Autism Spectrum

TIDES

TIDES is a unique classroom environment for students diagnosed as having an Autistic Spectrum Disorder or with low cognitive ability. TIDES offers a low student to teacher ratio, which allows for individualized classroom programming to meet their specific needs while allowing them to progress within the general education curriculum to the best of their ability. Using the principles of Applied Behavior Analysis, students’ specific skill deficits are addressed and strengthened in both group and individual instructional settings. Emphasis is placed on social and emotional development, strengthening communication skills, and developing independent learners in all environments.

Multiple Disabilities

VISTA

The Vista program is designed for students who have multiple disabilities, including those students with physical and cognitive impairments. The Vista program offers a home base classroom that provides a calm, slower pace for students to receive their academic instruction. Emphasis is placed on functional academics and social skills that are unique to the students' individual needs. The Vista program emphasizes transition planning and activities through age 21, including access to a transition coordinator, job coach, and a Structured Learning Experience (SLE) teacher.

Technology
As of 2014, Roxbury has implemented a 1:1 device program, where each student in grades 6-12 receives a Google Chromebook that they may use for the year.  With the switch to Chromebooks, the district uses the Google Workspace (formerly G Suite and Google Apps).  All students and staff have their own Gmail account and save all files through Google Drive.  With this technology push, the district has significantly increased its technology-based Professional Development (PD), offering trainings during the in-service days as well as optional paid summer workshops.

Each classroom has 1-2 computers, a printer, a digital projector and a SmartBoard.  Also in 2013–2015, the district established a new intercom system, digital clocks, and phone charging stations.  In 2017, a Makerspace was established in the Media Center, allowing students to build, create, and develop an endless number of projects.

Performing arts
Roxbury High School offers a comprehensive performing arts curriculum.

As mentioned above, Eisenhower Middle School and Roxbury High School, are choice schools for the Fine and Performing Arts.

Band
In 2005, Roxbury performed "The Music of Scheherazade", and placed 2nd at the United States Scholastic Band Association (USSBA) New Jersey state championships with a score of 96.70, and 4th overall at the USSBA East Coast Championships at Giants Stadium with a score of 96.48.  In 2006, the music from Stravinsky's "The Firebird" earned second place at USSBA Regionals with a score of 97.375, a new record in the school at the time.  In 2007, records were broken with the Gaels performing their show "Deja View" winning them USSBA Group 6 Open NJ state championships and winning 1st place overall at the USSBA Regionals with a score of 98.00. In 2009, Roxbury won 1st place at National Championships with their show "Upon A King".  They received a score of 98.188, Roxbury's highest score ever received. Since 2009, the RHS Marching Gaels have consistently placed as a finalist at numerous Bands of America Regional Championships.

The Roxbury Honors Wind Symphony has distinguished itself as a prominent band in the Eastern United States, and has received many "superior" ratings. It has also performed at the prestigious Midwest Clinic. The Roxbury Bands are conducted by Jeff Conrad, Sarah Bednarcik, and Ryan Sweer.

Roxbury High School Indoor Percussion was founded by Justin Kulick and Shannon Perrone, with their first competitive season in 2015. In 2019, the group was named Scholastic A Class Champions at the USBands Indoor Percussion Championships at Fair Lawn High School. With 35 students, grades 8-12, they competed with their show, "We Built Our Own World". Out of four groups, Roxbury placed first in the categories of Music, Visual, and Visual Effect with a score of 92.75.

The Roxbury Marching Gaels (directed by Ryan Sweer)
Roxbury High School Indoor Percussion (directed by Justin Kulick and Shannon Perrone)
The Concert Band (directed by Jeff Conrad)
The Symphony Band (directed by Sarah Bednarcik and Ryan Sweer)
The Honors Wind Symphony (directed by Jeff Conrad)
The Jazz Ensemble (directed by Ryan Sweer)
The Jazz Big Band (directed by Gregory Boccuti)

Composer Robert Farnon composed The Gaels: An American Wind Symphony, as a commission to the Roxbury High School band in honor of the school's mascot, the Gael. The piece made its world debut in May 2006. It was performed by the Roxbury High School Honors Wind Symphony under the direction of Dr. Stanley Saunders, a close friend of Farnon.

The band has also performed in New York City's Carnegie Hall and Lincoln Center.

Starting in 2014, the Roxbury High School Band Program has hosted the Music for All Metropolitan Wind Band Invitational, a concert band festival at which bands from around the state and region are adjudicated by well-known conductors and music educators from around the United States.

Choir
The Roxbury Choir program has 9 different performing groups. Select ensembles tour every year to regional and national contests and festivals. Former Roxbury Director of Choral Activities, Lorraine Lynch, initiated the Roxbury Invitational Choral Festival, which is held annually, attracting two dozen choirs from as far as Maine and Virginia. The 2006 tour took the Roxbury Choir to the Music in the Parks Festival, where the choir received six 1st-place trophies, six overall ratings of Superior, and the overall best choir of the day. In March 2007, Classic Sounds Honors traveled to Carnegie Hall for the second time.  Since 2017, the choir continues to compete under the new director - Patrick Hachey.

Roxbury Classic Sounds Honors (directed by Patrick Hachey)
Roxbury Chorale (directed by Krista Sweer)
Roxbury Concert Choir (directed by Patrick Hachey & R. Daniel Salyerds)
Roxbury Freshman Treble Choir (directed by R. Daniel Salyerds)
Roxbury Madrigals (directed by R. Daniel Salyerds)
Roxbury Revelation (directed by Patrick Hachey)
Roxbury Vocal Jazz (directed by Krista Sweer)
Roxbury Melodies (directed by Krista Sweer)
Roxbury Glee Club (directed by R. Daniel Salyerds)

Dance
There are four levels of curricular dance classes offered. Directed by Rebecca Pietras, students learn basic technique and various styles of dance including modern, jazz, contemporary, lyrical, and hip-hop. The curriculum is suited for dancers of all levels of skill. There are two Advanced Dance Ensembles, split according to grade level, in which students are required to audition for placement. These students perform at the Winter Dance Showcase in December, and at the annual Dance Concert in May. They also have opportunities to perform at Pep Rallies, Festivals, and school assemblies. The other dance ensembles perform at the Spring Dance Concert in June. Select students perform dance roles in the school musical in March.

Extracurricular activities
Roxbury has an extensive selection of extra-curricular activities, which involve a large portion of the student body.

Academic
Academic Decathlon
Debate Club
DECA: Distributive Education Cooperative of America
FBLA: Future Business Leaders of America
JSA: Junior State of America
Literary Magazine
Math League
Model Congress
Model United Nations
National Honor Society
Roxbotics: Robotics
Roxbury Review (Student publication) - Three-time winner of the GSSPA Best All-Around Paper
Science League

Arts
Art Club
Fall Drama
National Art Honor Society
Spring Musical

Languages
French National Honor Society
French Club
Spanish National Honor Society
Spanish Club

Student government and leadership
Echo (Yearbook)
Gaelvision (broadcast club)
Rox-THON
Peer-to-Peer Program
Student Council

Other
Best Buddies
Chess Club
Color Guard
Environmental Club
Film Club
Gay Straight Alliance
Key Club
Lighthouse Bible Club
Multicultural Club
Rotary Interact
SEAS: Student Empowerment & Advocacy
Ski/Snowboard club
Sports Medicine club
Varsity "R"
Yearbook

Rox-THON
Roxbury High School's Rox-THON strives to raise awareness and support our local community in the fight against pediatric cancer. Donations will go to Goryeb Children's Hospital (Morristown, NJ) to improve care and financially assist families, while 30% of those proceeds will go toward cancer research and medical bills through Four Diamonds (Penn State Children’s Hospital).  Each year since 2014, Roxbury has hosted an event during the spring.

The idea to start a mini-THON was brought to Roxbury's Key Club in 2013, by then Junior Rachel Synalovski to the late Mrs. Nicole Barbato-Connolly (Advisor at the time).  Mini-THON's are a national movement through Four Diamonds to conquer childhood cancer by assisting children treated at Penn State Health Children's Hospital and their families through superior care, comprehensive support, and innovative research. In 2017, the event went overnight and held a kick-off assembly a month in advanced.  This led to a dramatic (nearly 300%) increase in student involvement and fundraising.  As a result of these efforts, Roxbury received the Excellence in Fundraising Award from Four Diamonds, an honor given to one school out of the 235 mini-THONs at the time. In 2019, Roxbury's mini-THON transitioned to Rox-THON in order to support the Roxbury community including Goryeb Children's Hospital.  Through 2021, RHS has raised over $300,000 through 8 events.
Rox-THON by the numbers:

Roxbotix
Since 2012, Roxbury has witnessed the growth of an exceptional STEM program - Roxbotix. This is a robotics program offered for students to develop a robot each year to accomplish a series of tasks in a competition style. Roxbury has competed at a high level each year, having gone to Nationals in Detroit in 2018.  Under the direction of Mr. Mark Tayler, the program continues to expand and attract more students.

Athletics
Roxbury High School's mascot is the Gael, an Irish/Scottish warrior, which was a nickname given to the football team in the 1930s by local news writers because of three Irish brothers on the team that were standouts. The Roxbury High School Gaels compete in the American Division of the Northwest Jersey Athletic Conference, which includes public and private high schools in Morris, Sussex and Warren counties, and was established following a reorganization of sports leagues in Northern New Jersey by the New Jersey State Interscholastic Athletic Association (NJSIAA). Prior to the NJSIAA's 2010 realignment, the school had competed as part of the Iron Hills Conference, which included public and private high schools in Essex, Morris and Union counties. With 1,010 students in grades 10-12, the school was classified by the NJSIAA for the 2019–20 school year as Group III for most athletic competition purposes, which included schools with an enrollment of 761 to 1,058 students in that grade range. The football team competes in the Freedom Blue division of the North Jersey Super Football Conference, which includes 112 schools competing in 20 divisions, making it the nation's biggest football-only high school sports league. The school was classified by the NJSIAA as Group IV North for football for 2018–2020.

Interscholastic sports offered include basketball, cross country, football, golf, field hockey, swimming, soccer, tennis, lacrosse, wrestling, track, volleyball, baseball, ice hockey, and softball. The Gaels once had a bowling team, but it is no longer in existence. Roxbury has a girls gymnastics team that went through a three-year trial from 2018 - 2021.

Athletics teams 
 Baseball (boys)
 Basketball (boys and girls)
 Cheerleading (girls)
 Competitive cheer (girls)
 Cross country (boys and girls)
 Field hockey (girls)
 Football (boys)
 Golf (boys)
 Gymnastics 
 Ice hockey (boys)
 Lacrosse (boys and girls)
 Soccer (boys and girls)
 Softball (girls)
 Spring track (boys and girls)
 Swimming (boys and girls)
 Tennis (boys and girls)
 Volleyball (girls)
 Winter track (boys and girls)
 Wrestling (boys)

Athletics history 
The softball team won the North sectional championship in 1972, the North II sectional title in 1973 and won the Group IV state championship in 1992 against Middletown High School North. The 1992 team finished the season with a 24-5 record after winning the Group IV title by defeating Middletown North by a score of 3-2 in the championship game. The 2021 team finished with a 20-7 record, winning the North I, Group III Sectional Championship against Passaic Valley High School.

The wrestling team won the North II Group IV sectional championship in 1983 and 1996, won the North II Group III title in 2004, won in North II Group III in 2011 and 2014, and won in North I Group IV in 2015, 2016 and 2018

The baseball team has won the Morris County Tournament six times, tied for the second-most in tournament history, winning in 1996-1998, 2011, 2014 and 2015.

The girls soccer team won the Group IV state championship in 1997, defeating Eastern Regional High School in the final game of the playoff tournament. The girls soccer team has won eight Morris County Championships (1997, 1998, 2003, 2004, 2007, 2014-2016).

The girls track team won the Group III indoor relay championship in 1999.

The girls track team won the indoor Group III state title in 2000 and 2008.

The girls cross country team won the Group IV state title in 2004 and 2005.

The ice hockey team won the Haas Cup in 2008 and the Halvorsen Cup in 2016 and 2017.

The 2015 girls volleyball team finished with a 22-6 record, winning the Morris County Tournament championship, the program's first, against West Morris Central High School. The 2021 team finished with a 24-5 record, winning the North I Group III sectional championship against Wayne Valley High School, and the Morris County Tournament title against West Morris Mendham High School.

Football history
The first Roxbury football team was formed by students in 1913 and lost their first game to Newton High School by a score of 7–0. Under Coach J.B. Shambaugh, the 1926 team won the school's first state championship, taking the Class 'C' Regional title. The 1928 team won the second state championship in school history, in the team's only season with Coach Robert Mohor.
 
The first of Roxbury's early rivals was Dover High School, who they beat for the first time in 1917 by a score of 7–6. A turkey dinner was given to the team whenever they topped the Tigers. By 1929, Hackettstown High School became the annual Thanksgiving Day contest. The series ended in 1976 with a 34-7 Gael victory; Roxbury and Hackettstown have not played since. One of the most intense rivalries in the state began in 1965 against Randolph High School. The rivalry with Randolph was listed at 18th on NJ.com's 2017 list "Ranking the 31 fiercest rivalries in N.J. HS football". Randolph leads the rivalry with a 29–20–3 overall record as of 2017.
 
The early 1930s saw a string of five County Class 'B' Championships, climaxed by Roxbury's only undefeated season in 1934, when the team won the Morris County title and finished with an 8-0-2 record. The 1941 team, known as the Galloping Gaels, registered six shutouts. In addition to winning the Morris County Championship, the 1942 team posted the Gaels' 100th victory. The 1959 team won the school's third state championship, being declared North II, Group II champions after finishing the season with a 6-2-1 mark. Roxbury's 200th win came in 1964 and the 300th win came in 1979, a 30–10 win over Dover High School. Roxbury's 400th win was in 1998 over Columbia High School, 40–0. The 500th win was in 2014 over Morristown High School.
 
The 1986 and 1987 teams advanced to the state tournament finals, losing to Union High School on both occasions. 1987 was the senior season of Dave Moore '88, a future NFL pro-bowler, whose #88 became the team's first number to be retired.

2002 marked Head Coach Cosmo Lorusso's first year in Roxbury, when the Gaels made the sectional semi-finals and finished as IHC-Iron Tri-Champions. The 2009 team jumped to an 8–0 start, quickly winning the inaugural Northwest Jersey Athletic Conference-American Division championship. After two sound victories to start the '09 postseason, Roxbury faced East Orange Campus High School in the state sectional championship, played at Giants Stadium, winning 14-6 and clinching the fifth state title in school history, as well as setting the school record for wins in a season with 11.

In 2012, the Roxbury High School Football Gaels played their 100th season of football, celebrating it with an 11–1 season and the program's sixth state championship with a 14–6 victory over Pascack Valley High School in the North I Group IV finals at Kean University.

State Sectional Championships

Hall of Fame 
In 2013, Roxbury High School established an Alumni Hall of Fame, which honors alumni, coaches and friends of Roxbury High School who have demonstrated exceptional personal achievement, distinctive contributions to the advancement of athletics and heartfelt dedication to Roxbury High School. The Alumni Hall of Fame has inducted 6 to 9 new individuals each year.  A full list of members can be found on the Roxbury Athletics website.

Notable alumni 
 Lois Barker (1923-2018, class of 1941), utility player who played in the All-American Girls Professional Baseball League during the  season.
 Ralph Barkman (1907–1998). American football player who played in the NFL for the Orange Tornadoes.
 Dylan Castanheira (born 1995), soccer player who plays as a goalkeeper for Fort Lauderdale CF in USL League One.
 Paige Monaghan (born 1996), professional soccer player who currently plays for Sky Blue FC of the National Women's Soccer League.
 Dave Moore (born 1969, class of 1988), tight end, fullback and long snapper who played in the NFL for the Buffalo Bills and Tampa Bay Buccaneers.

References

External links
Roxbury High School website

School Data for the Roxbury School District, National Center for Education Statistics
Roxbury High School Yearbook Archive

Roxbury Township, New Jersey
Mount Arlington, New Jersey
1903 establishments in New Jersey
Educational institutions established in 1903
Public high schools in Morris County, New Jersey